Valerie Winifred Gearon (27 September 1937 – 9 July 2003) was a British actress, born in Newport, Monmouthshire. She was known for Anne of the Thousand Days (1969), Nine Hours to Rama (1963) and Invasion (1966). From 1962 to 1970 she was married to British producer William Rory "Kip" Gowans, with whom she had children. She died in Bath, Somerset, England.

Filmography

Cinema
Fate Takes a Hand (1961) as Peggy
Nine Hours to Rama (1963) as Rani Mehta
Invasion (1966) as Dr. Claire Harland
Anne of the Thousand Days (1969) as Mary Boleyn

Television
An Age of Kings (1960) ("Henry IV: The Road to Shrewsbury") as Lady Mortimer 
Eugénie Grandet (1965), (dir: Rex Tucker) as Eugenie
The Nigel Barton Plays (1965) (Dennis Potter play) as Ann Barton
Persuasion (1971) as Elizabeth Elliot
Casanova (1971) as Pauline

References

External links

1937 births
2003 deaths
British film actresses
British television actresses
People from Newport, Wales